Major Hercharn Singh (Punjabi (Gurmukhi): ਹਰਚਰਨ ਸਿੰਘ; (Shahmukhi): ;) (born 1987) is the first Sikh officer to be commissioned in the Pakistan Army. He was born in Nankana Sahib, Pakistan, which is also the birthplace of the founder of Sikhism, Guru Nanak.

Early life
Hercharn passed his matriculation from Government Guru Nanak High School and passed his FSc (pre-engineering) in 2004 from Forman Christian College in Lahore. He then passed the ISSB examination in 2006 and joined the Pakistan Military Academy.

Personal life
He is currently 36 years old and married his wife on 3 December 2017

Graduation
Hercharn passed out from PMA from 116 L/C and was commissioned into the Pakistan Army on 27 October 2007.

Hercharn had told reporters:

References

External links
Pakistan Army recruits first Sikh officer

Sikh warriors
Pakistani Sikhs
Pakistan Army officers
1986 births
Living people
Punjabi people
People from Nankana Sahib District
Forman Christian College alumni